Brandon Tyler Cottom (born December 21, 1992) is a former American football fullback. He played college football at Purdue University.

College career
Cottom committed to the Purdue on February 2, 2011. Cottom played all four years with the Boilermakers, playing in 38 games over that span. Cottom scored 6 touchdowns, 436 rushing yards with an average of 5.7 yards per carry.

Statistics

Professional career

Seattle Seahawks
On May 2, 2015, Cottom was signed by the Seahawks. On August 31, 2015, he was waived. On September 1, 2015, Cottom was placed on injured reserve. On September 3, 2015, he was waived by the Seahawks. On November 16, 2015, Cottom was re-signed to the practice squad.

On August 20, 2016, Cottom was waived by the Seahawks with an injury designation.

On May 5, 2017, Cottom re-signed with the Seahawks. On May 15, 2017, Cottom was waived by the Seahawks.

On September 14, 2018, Cottom signed with the Alliance Salt Lake City of the Alliance of American Football.

On March 29, 2019, Cottom was assigned to the Philadelphia Soul of the Arena Football League.

Survivor
Cottom was cast to compete on the currently airing 44th season of Survivor. He started the game placed on the Ratu tribe.

References

External links
Seattle Seahawks bio
Purdue Boilermakers bio

1992 births
Living people
American football fullbacks
Players of American football from Pennsylvania
Sportspeople from Bucks County, Pennsylvania
Purdue Boilermakers football players
Seattle Seahawks players
Salt Lake Stallions players
Philadelphia Soul players
Survivor (American TV series) contestants